Luciano Gomes Leandro (born 1 February 1966 in Brazil) is a Brazilian football manager.

Career

Leandro started enjoying football after seeing his brother become a professional footballer. 

Despite being told that he was signing for a Malaysian team, Leandro arrived in Indonesia in 1995, where he chose to play for PSM Makassar. One of the factors which caused him to stay in Indonesia were the beaches, which he enjoyed. 

After retiring, he opened a hotel in Brazil named the Hotel Makassar, which serves Makassar specialties inside its restaurant.

References

External links
 Luciano Leandro at oGol 

Brazilian footballers
Association football midfielders
Brazilian football managers
Living people
1966 births
PSM Makassar players
Persija Jakarta players
Macaé Esporte Futebol Clube managers
Goytacaz Futebol Clube managers
Persipura Jayapura managers